Songea Airport  is an airport in southern Tanzania serving the town of Songea and the surrounding Ruvuma Region.

The Songea non-directional beacon (Ident: SG) is located on the field.

Airlines and destinations

See also

 List of airports in Tanzania
 Transport in Tanzania

References

External links
Tanzania Airports Authority

Airports in Tanzania
Buildings and structures in the Ruvuma Region